Modang is a Kayan language spoken in East Kalimantan, Indonesia.

External links

Languages of Indonesia
Kayan–Murik languages